Chip LaMarca is an American politician who is a Republican member of the Florida Legislature representing the state's 93rd House District, which includes part of Broward County. In 2010, LaMarca took on incumbent Broward County Commissioner Ken Keechl and won. In 2014, LaMarca beat Keechl in a rematch. LaMarca spent 8 years on the county commission and was the sole Republican elected on the board.

History
A native of Winchester, Massachusetts, LaMarca moved to Florida in 1971. Prior to his election to the Florida House of Representatives, LaMarca served on the Lighthouse Point City Commission and the Broward County Commission.

LaMarca owns and operates LaMarca Construction Corporation, a construction group specializing in turnkey power generation and fuel systems, with a professional history in environmental systems, concentrating in groundwater and soil remediation.

Florida House of Representatives
In 2018, LaMarca decided to run for the open state house seat in Northeast Broward County, House District 93. He was unopposed in the primary and was elected to the Florida House of Representatives in the November 6, 2018 general election, defeating Democrat Emma Collum and a third candidate, Kelly Milam with 52.78% of the vote.

2021-2022 Committee Assignments 
Joint Committee on Public Counsel Oversight  (Alternating Chair)  
Tourism, Infrastructure & Energy Subcommittee  (Vice Chair)
Early Learning & Elementary Education Subcommittee
Education & Employment Committee
Environment, Agriculture & Flooding Subcommittee
Infrastructure & Tourism Appropriations Subcommittee

Election history

References

Republican Party members of the Florida House of Representatives
Living people
21st-century American politicians
Broward College alumni
People from Winchester, Massachusetts
1968 births